Dehradun Lok Sabha constituency was a Lok Sabha (parliamentary) constituency in Uttar Pradesh (now part of Uttarakhand). This constituency came into existence in 1952 and existed until 1977, following the delimitation of Lok Sabha constituencies.

Assembly segments

Dehradun Lok Sabha constituency comprised the following five Vidhan Sabha (legislative assembly) constituency segments of Uttar Pradesh:

Members of Parliament
Keys:

Election results

General Election, 1957

General Election, 1962

General Election, 1967

General Election, 1971

See also
 List of former constituencies of the Lok Sabha

References

Former Lok Sabha constituencies of Uttarakhand
Former constituencies of the Lok Sabha